Lassana Perera (born 26 January 1984) is a Sri Lankan cricketer. He made his first-class debut for Chilaw Marians Cricket Club in the 2006–07 Premier Trophy on 10 November 2006.

See also
 List of Chilaw Marians Cricket Club players

References

External links
 

1984 births
Living people
Sri Lankan cricketers
Badureliya Sports Club cricketers
Chilaw Marians Cricket Club cricketers